Jack the Ripper is an adventure video game, based upon the unidentified serial killer Jack the Ripper. The game was released for Microsoft Windows in 2004. It was developed by Galilea Games and published by The Adventure Company.

The game is set in New York in 1901, where James Palmer, a reporter of the newspaper New York Today, is investigating a set of murders similar to those of "Jack the Ripper" in Whitechapel thirteen years earlier; the murders turn out to be the work of the actual Ripper.

Reception

The game received "mixed" reviews according to the review aggregation website Metacritic.

References

External links

2004 video games
Adventure games
Point-and-click adventure games
Microïds games
The Adventure Company games
Video games about Jack the Ripper
Video games developed in France
Video games set in New York City
Windows games
Windows-only games